Sam Lee (born 21 February 1973,) is a Taiwanese singer and songwriter. He is one-quarter German through his maternal grandfather. He graduated from Soochow University, and was once on the Taiwanese national tennis team.

Discography

Television career
 心動列車

Awards
 2006 Hito Popular Music Award 年度Hito長壽專輯

External links

 Sam Lee's blog

1973 births
Living people
Taiwanese Mandopop singer-songwriters
Taiwanese people of German descent
Musicians from Kaohsiung
Writers from Kaohsiung
21st-century Taiwanese  male singers
Taiwanese Roman Catholics